Bernard Tekpetey (born 3 September 1997) is a Ghanaian professional footballer who plays as a forward for Bulgarian First League club Ludogorets Razgrad.

Club career
Having successfully undergone a trial period, Schalke 04 signed Tekpetey was signed from Ghanaian second-tier side Unistar Soccer Academy in February 2016. He made his debut for the club on 24 November, starting in a 2–0 win over OGC Nice. He won a penalty, which was converted by Dennis Aogo for Schalke's second goal, before being sent off in the second-half after committing two bookable offences.

After a season-long loan to Ludogorets Razgrad, Tekpetey permanently joined the team on 29 June 2021.

International career
Tekpetey was called up to the Ghana national football team for the 2017 Africa Cup of Nations. He made his debut for Ghana in a 1–0 loss to Egypt national football team on 25 January 2017.

Career statistics

Club

International

Honours
Ludogorets Razgrad
Bulgarian First League: (2) 2020–21, 2021–22
Bulgarian Supercup: (2) 2021, 2022

Individual
Best foreign player in Bulgarian football for 2022

References

External links
 

1997 births
Living people
Footballers from Accra
Association football forwards
Ghanaian footballers
Ghana international footballers
FC Schalke 04 players
FC Schalke 04 II players
SC Rheindorf Altach players
SC Paderborn 07 players
Fortuna Düsseldorf players
PFC Ludogorets Razgrad players
Bundesliga players
2. Bundesliga players
Regionalliga players
Austrian Football Bundesliga players
First Professional Football League (Bulgaria) players
Ghanaian expatriate footballers
Ghanaian expatriate sportspeople in Germany
Expatriate footballers in Germany
Expatriate footballers in Austria
Expatriate footballers in Bulgaria
2017 Africa Cup of Nations players